Halashi (also Romanized as Halashī) is a city and capital of Firuzabad District, in Kermanshah County, Kermanshah Province, Iran.  At the 2006 census, its population was 457, in 114 families.

References

Populated places in Kermanshah County

Cities in Kermanshah Province